NA-260 (Chagai-cum-Nushki-cum-Kharan-cum-Washuk) is a constituency for the National Assembly of Pakistan. It comprises the districts of Chagai, Nushki and Kharan from the province of Balochistan. It was created in 2018 out of two former constituencies namely NA-268 (Chagai-cum-Nushki-cum-Kharan)NA-270 (Panjgur-cum-Washuk-cum-Awaran)by taking out areas of Chagai and Kharan districts respectively and merging with areas of Nushki District and Washuk Districts to create this constituency.

Assembly Segments

Members of Parliament

Since 2018: NA-268 Chagai-cum-Nushki-cum-Kharan

Election 2018

General elections were held on 25 July 2018.

See also
NA-259 Panjgur-cum-Kech
NA-261 Mastung-cum-Surab-cum-Kalat

References 

National Assembly Constituencies of Pakistan